Westgate Mall is a shopping mall located in Bethlehem, Pennsylvania. It is anchored by Harbor Freight Tools, Lehigh Valley Health Network, Sky Zone Trampoline Park, and Weis Markets.

History
The first buildings on the mall property were constructed in 1964 by Harold Campbell. George's IGA Foodliner opened in 1967 and Hess's was built on the site in 1971. Westgate Mall was built in 1973. On February 12, 1977 a three-alarm fire occurred at the Westgate Mall causing the loss of 18 stores and injuries to several firefighters. The fire only stopped due to a firewall and was ruled arson, but no suspect was ever found. Damage to the mall totaled  $2,857,452. George's IGA was sold to King's IGA in 1992, with King's planning to make upgrades. Hess's interior was redesigned in 1993 and the store was purchased by The Bon-Ton in 1994. From 1999-2005, a legal dispute over the land that housed The Bon-Ton occurred, and it was eventually sold to PREIT for $500,000. Newberry's converted to a Dollar Zone before closing in April 2002.

The family of Harold Campbell attempted to take control of Westgate Mall on June 4, 2002, which resulted in legal action by the mall's two managers, who had power of attorney over it since 1997. The issue was later settled in 2002 with the managers retaining control of the mall. Starting in November 2011, The Market at Westgate farmers market opened at the mall on Wednesdays. City View Capital LLC purchased most of the mall in June 2013 for $2.3 million. PREIT, who owned the land that housed The Bon-Ton, later sold it to an affiliate of the mall's owners in December 2014 for $3.85 million. The owners of Westgate announced in mid-2015 that the mall would receive $5 million in changes, including a new facade. Sky Zone Trampoline Park was announced as a future addition to the mall in August 2015. The Bon-Ton chain liquidated starting in April 2018, with Westgate's store closing during the summer. Jack Williams Tire subleased space from The Bon-Ton.

Westgate Mall was sold to Onyx Equities LLC and PCCP LLC in October 2018 for $30 million. Weis Markets moved from its existing space at Westgate into part of the former Bon-Ton in May 2021. Lehigh Valley Health Network leased part of the former Bon-Ton for equipment storage in December 2021. Harbor Freight Tools opened in the mall 2022, using part of the space formerly occupied by Weis Markets. Redevelopment plans for Westgate Mall were announced in March 2022. The plans call for over 50,000 square feet of interior space to be demolished and replaced by new buildings, along with facade changes.

On February 9, 2023, the interior of the mall's remaining tenants, Amateur Athlete, Fashion Nails, Hawk Music, Subway, and Westgate Jewelers & Repairs, were informed to vacate the mall within around March-April, informing the interior would permanently close for redevelopment.

Notes

References

External links
Onyx Equities Westgate Mall

1973 establishments in Pennsylvania
Buildings and structures in Lehigh County, Pennsylvania
Defunct shopping malls in the United States
Shopping malls established in 1973
Shopping malls disestablished in 2023
2023 disestablishments in Pennsylvania
Shopping malls in Northampton County, Pennsylvania
Tourist attractions in Lehigh County, Pennsylvania